In enzymology, a glutamate 1-kinase is an enzyme that catalyzes the chemical reaction

ATP + L-glutamate  ADP + alpha-L-glutamyl phosphate

Thus, the two substrates of this enzyme are ATP and L-glutamate, whereas its two products are ADP and alpha-L-glutamyl phosphate.

This enzyme belongs to the family of transferases, specifically those transferring phosphorus-containing groups (phosphotransferases) with a carboxy group as acceptor.  The systematic name of this enzyme class is ATP:L-glutamate 1-phosphotransferase.

References

 

EC 2.7.2
Enzymes of unknown structure